René Matte may refer to:

 René Matte (politician) (1935–2016), Canadian politician
 René Matte (ice hockey) (born 1972), Canadian ice hockey coach and executive